The following article outlines the discography of French rapper, songwriter and record producer Orelsan, which includes four solo studio albums, two extended plays and multiple singles. He is also one half of the French hip hop duo Casseurs Flowters, along with Gringe, with whom he has released two studio albums.

His first single, "Changement", was released in 2008 as the lead single from his first studio album, Perdu d'avance, which was released in 2009. His first extended play, Zéro, was released in 2010. His second studio album, Le chant des sirènes, was released in 2011. "RaelSan" was released as the lead single from the album, with five more singles released from the album thereafter.

Together with fellow rapper Gringe, Orelsan released Orelsan et Gringe sont les Casseurs Flowters, in 2013 as the duo Casseurs Flowters. "Bloqué" was released as the lead single from the album. In 2015, the two followed up with their second studio album as a duo, Comment c'est loin, which is also a soundtrack album for their film of the same name. "À l'heure où je me couche" was released as the album's lead single.

On 20 September 2017, Orelsan released the first single from his third solo studio album, entitled "Basique", along with its music video which went viral, generating 100+ million views on Youtube. On 20 October 2017, the album La fête est finie was released, to huge critical and commercial success, selling over one million copies in France.

Civilisation is his fourth solo studio album, released on 19 November 2021. It topped the French Albums Chart and Belgian (Wallonia) record chart Ultratop. Most notable singles from the album include  L'odeur de l'essence, "Jour meilleur" and "La Quête" .

Albums

Studio albums

Collaborative albums

Mixtape

Extended plays

Singles

As lead artist

As featured artist

Other charted songs

Guest appearances

Music videos

Production

2011
Orelsan – Le chant des sirènes
 9. "La petite marchande de porte-clefs" (co-produced with Marc Chouarain)

2013
Stromae – Racine carrée
 4. "Ave cesaria" (co-produced with Stromae, Mauricio Delgados, Antonio Santos, Vincent Peirani and Schérazade)
 13. "AVF" (featuring Maître Gims and Orelsan; co-produced with Stromae, Maître Gims and Atom)

Casseurs Flowters – Orelsan et Gringe sont les Casseurs Flowters
 8. "19h26 – La mort du disque"
 16. "03h53 – Manger c'est tricher"

2017
Orelsan – La fête est finie
 7. "Bonne meuf"

See also
 Casseurs Flowters discography

Footnotes

References

External links
 
 
 

Discography
 
 
Hip hop discographies
Production discographies
Discographies of French artists